Diego Neves de Jesus (born 13 June 1986 in Serra) is a Brazilian footballer who plays as a forward.

Career
In June 2013, Diego signed with Bulgarian side Slavia Sofia on a two-year deal.
He was released some weeks after.

Statistics

References

External links

1986 births
Living people
Brazilian footballers
Brazilian expatriate footballers
Esporte Clube Noroeste players
Oeste Futebol Clube players
Madureira Esporte Clube players
PFC Slavia Sofia players
Fortaleza Esporte Clube players
Brazilian expatriate sportspeople in Bulgaria
Expatriate footballers in Bulgaria
First Professional Football League (Bulgaria) players
Association football forwards